State Route 236 is a  long state highway in Fulton County and DeKalb County, Georgia. The route begins at Piedmont Road (SR 237) in south Buckhead and ends at Stone Mountain Freeway (US 78/SR 10) exit 7 in Stone Mountain.  It is signed as Lindbergh Drive in Fulton County, and LaVista Road and Hugh Howell Road in DeKalb County.  It is also concurrent with US 29/SR 8 for less than a mile in DeKalb.

Route description

SR 236 begins at an intersection with SR 237 (Piedmont Road) in Buckhead, Atlanta. The route heads east on Lindbergh Drive, a street which begins a mile to the west of SR 237 at US 19/SR 9. Midway between SR 237 and the Fulton-DeKalb County line, SR 236 passes under a large interchange connecting Interstate 85, SR 13, and SR 400 and connects to I-85 northbound HOV lane via an on-ramp located in the center of the interchange.

Past I-85, SR 236 curves to the southeast and crosses into DeKalb County, where Lindbergh Drive becomes LaVista Road at Cheshire Bridge Road. As LaVista Road, SR 236 is two lanes wide and has a 35 miles per hour speed limit. As the route heads east toward Tucker, SR 236 intersects a number of primary north–south arterials, including SR 42, US 23/SR 155, and Interstate 285 (at exit 37). SR 236 becomes 5 lanes wide about 1/2 mile before Northlake.

In  Tucker, LaVista Road comes to an end at Lawrenceville Highway (US 29/SR 8); however, SR 236 turns right onto Lawrenceville Highway, joining US 29 and SR 8 for a short distance southward before separating at Hugh Howell Road, a roadway connecting Tucker to Stone Mountain Park. SR 236 follows Hugh Howell Road east, passing through largely industrial and business districts. After it crosses Mountain Industrial Boulevard, the surroundings along the road become largely residential as it heads southeast through a subdivision known as Smoke Rise.

SR 236, as well as Hugh Howell Road, comes to an end at an interchange with the Stone Mountain Freeway (US 78/SR 10) southeast of Smoke Rise and directly north of Stone Mountain Park.

History

The segment of SR 236 east of Lawrenceville Highway was given its present name (Hugh Howell Road) during the 1960s.  It was named after Hugh Howell (b. 1888), an Atlanta area attorney and developer. His career included, among other things, a stint as chair of the Democratic Party in Georgia during the 1930s.  The road was previously known as Rosser Road and according to a 1948 map, carried State Road number 141.

Major intersections

See also
 
 
 Transportation in Atlanta

References

External links

236
Transportation in Fulton County, Georgia
Transportation in DeKalb County, Georgia
Roads in Atlanta
North Druid Hills, Georgia
Tucker, Georgia
Stone Mountain